Salim Jay (born 30 June 1951) is a Franco-Moroccan novelist, essayist and literary critic living in France. He has written about 20 books, numerous essays and more than thousand newspaper articles.

His "Dictionnaire des Écrivains marocains", published in 2005 by "éditions EDDIF (Maroc)" and "Paris-Méditérannée (France)" is a biographical dictionary of Moroccan writers who have expressed themselves in French language. The book has established itself already as a standard reference tool.

Biography
He was born on 30 June 1951 in Paris from a Moroccan father and Romanian mother. Salim Jay lived in Rabat from 1957 to 1973. His father was a poet who wrote in classical Arabic and was a friend of late king Mohammed V to whom Jay devoted the novel "Portrait du Géniteur en Poète Officiel" (Denoel, 1985). When Salim Jay was fourteen he made his first steps in journalism. He wrote an article for l'Opinion, the newspaper of the nationalist and royalist Istiqlal Party. In 1973 he heeded warnings and went into exile in France. He would not return for 29 years. He kept contact with his native country through the writings of other Moroccans. Salim Jay has a column in "Qantara", the magazine of the prestigious 'Institut du Monde Arabe' in Paris.

Besides articles on the literature of Morocco, Jay has written on French writers like Michel Tournier, Henri Thomas and Jean Freustié. His own favorite is "101 Maliens nous manquent", 1987, ed. Arcantère.

Bibliography
Brèves notes cliniques sur le cas Guy des Cars Barbare, 1979
La Semaine où Madame Simone eut cent ans La Différence, 1979
Le Fou de lecture et les quarante romans Confrontation, 1981
Tu seras Nabab, mon fils, (sous le pseudonyme d’Irène Refrain) Rupture, 1982
Bernard Frank Rupture 1982
Romans maghrébins L’Afrique littéraire, 1983
Romans du monde noir L’Afrique Littéraire, 1984
Portrait du géniteur en poète officiel Denoël, 1985
Idriss, Michel Tournier, et les autres La Différence, 1986
Cent un Maliens nous manquent Arcantère, 1987
L’Afrique de l’Occident (1887-1987) L’Afrique littéraire, 1987
L’Oiseau vit de sa plume Belfond, 1989
Avez-vous lu Henri Thomas ? Le Félin, 1990
Les Écrivains sont dans leur assiette « Point Virgule », Seuil, 1991
Starlette au haras, (sous le pseudonyme d’Alexandra Quadripley) Editions de Septembre, 1992
Du côté de Saint-Germain-des-Prés Jacques Bertoin, 1992
Pour Angelo Rinaldi Belles Lettres, 1994
Jean Freustié, romancier de la sincérité Le Rocher, 1998
Sagesse du milieu du monde Paris Méditerranée, 1999
Tu ne traverseras pas le détroit Mille et une nuits, 2001
Dictionnaire des écrivains marocains Paris Méditerranée - Eddif, 2005
Embourgeoisement immédiat ed. La Différence, 2006

References

External links
Article (in French) by Fouad Laroui "Salim Jay est-il un écrivain marrocain ?" 

1951 births
Living people
Moroccan novelists
Male novelists
Moroccan essayists
Moroccan male writers
Male essayists
Moroccan writers in French
French people of Romanian descent
Writers from Paris
Moroccan literary critics
Moroccan people of Romanian descent